is one of the 18 wards of the city of Yokohama in Kanagawa Prefecture, Japan. As of 2010, the ward had an estimated population of 176,038 and a density of 6,900 persons per km². The total area was 25.42  km².

Geography
Midori Ward is located in eastern Kanagawa Prefecture, and on the northwest borders of the city of Yokohama. Except for the northeast portion, much of the area is hilly and relatively sparsely populated compared to other parts of the city. The flatter northeast portion is located on the Tsurumi River basin, with the river serving as a ward boundary with Tsuzuki-ku.

Surrounding municipalities
Seya Ward
Kanagawa Ward
Kohoku Ward
Aoba Ward
Hodogaya Ward
Asahi Ward
Tsuzuki Ward
Machida, Tokyo

History
The area around present-day Midori Ward was formerly part of Tsuzuki District in Musashi Province. During the Edo period, it was a rural region classified as tenryō territory controlled directly by the Tokugawa shogunate, but administered through various hatamoto.  After the Meiji Restoration,  the area became part of the new Kanagawa Prefecture in 1868. In the cadastral reform of April 1, 1889, the area was divided into numerous villages. During the Meiji period, the area was a center for sericulture. On April 1, 1939, Tsuzuki District was annexed by the neighboring city of Yokohama. In a major administrative reorganization of October 1, 1969, Midori emerged as an independent ward within the city of Yokohama. In 1980, a portion of Midori Ward was transferred to Seya Ward. In 1994, Midori-ku was divided into the present-dau Midori-ku, and Aoba-ku and Tsuzuki-ku.

Economy
Midori Ward is largely a regional commercial center and bedroom community for central Yokohama and Tokyo. There is some residual agriculture in Midori Ward, primarily rice. Major industries include food processing, electronics and precision manufacturing.

Transportation

Railroads
JR East – Yokohama Line
  -  -  - 
Tokyu Corporation – Tōkyū Den-en-toshi Line, Kodomonokuni Line
 
Yokohama City Transportation Bureau - Green Line

Highways
Tōmei Expressway
Japan National Route 16
Japan National Route 246

Prefecture roads
Kanagawa Prefectural Route 109
Kanagawa Prefectural Route 139
Kanagawa Prefectural Route 140

Education
Several universities are located in the ward, most notably the Nagatsuta campus of the Tokyo Institute of Technology. Other universities include Showa University and Toyo Eiwa University.

Kanagawa Prefectural Board of Education operates prefectural high schools.
 
 

 operates public elementary and junior high schools.

There is a combined elementary and junior high school, Kirigaoka Gakuen (霧が丘学園).

Municipal junior high schools:

 Higashi Kamoi (東鴨居)
 Kamoi (鴨居)
 Nakayama (中山)
 Tana (田奈)
 Tokaichiba (十日市場)

Municipal elementary schools:

 Higashi Hongo (東本郷)
 Ibukino (いぶき野)
 Kamiyama (上山)
 Kamoi (鴨居)
 Midori (緑)
 Miho (三保)
 Morinodai (森の台)
 Nagatsuta (長津田)
 Nagatsuta Daini (No. 2) (長津田第二)
 Nakayama (中山)
 Niiharu (新治)
 Takeyama (竹山)
 Tokaichiba (十日市場)
 Yamashita (山下)
 Yamashita Midoridai (山下みどり台)

Tana Elementary School (田奈小学校), outside of Midori-ku, serves a part of Midori-ku.

 Private schools
 The Yokohama campus of the India International School in Japan is located in this ward.

Noted people from Midori Ward
Masahiro Inoue, actor
Masahiro Matsuoka, idol

Neighborhoods with Midori Ward
Areas with a -cho suffix are located in the less dense parts of the ward.

References
 Kato, Yuzo. Yokohama Past and Present. Yokohama City University (1990).

External links
 Official website of Midori-ku
 City of Yokohama statistics
 

Wards of Yokohama